David Añón González (born 3 April 1989) is a Spanish footballer who plays for Coruxo FC as a forward.

Club career
Añón was born in A Coruña, Galicia. A product of Deportivo de La Coruña's youth system, he made his official debut with the first team on 20 January 2010, in a 0–3 home loss against Sevilla FC in the quarter-finals of the Copa del Rey. On 28 February he first appeared in La Liga, playing four minutes – and being booked – in a 1–0 defeat at Villarreal CF.

After leaving Dépor, Añón represented Albacete Balompié, Celta de Vigo B, CD Boiro, UD Somozas, Pontevedra CF, Coruxo FC and CF Talavera de la Reina, all in the lower leagues and mostly in his native region. He also spent one year in the Polish I liga with GKS Katowice.

References

External links
Deportivo official profile 

1989 births
Living people
Spanish footballers
Footballers from A Coruña
Association football forwards
La Liga players
Segunda División B players
Tercera División players
Primera Federación players
Segunda Federación players
Deportivo Fabril players
Deportivo de La Coruña players
Albacete Balompié players
Celta de Vigo B players
CD Boiro footballers
UD Somozas players
Pontevedra CF footballers
Coruxo FC players
CF Talavera de la Reina players
I liga players
GKS Katowice players
Spanish expatriate footballers
Expatriate footballers in Poland
Spanish expatriate sportspeople in Poland